Oliver Twist is a 1985 BBC TV serial. It was produced by Terrance Dicks, directed by Gareth Davies, and adapted by Alexander Baron from the 1838 novel by Charles Dickens. This version follows the book more closely than any of the other film adaptions.

Plot
For a detailed plot, see Oliver Twist.

Cast 
 Eric Porter - Fagin
 Michael Attwell - Bill Sikes
Ben Rodska - Oliver Twist
 Amanda Harris - Nancy
 Godfrey James - Mr. Bumble
 Frank Middlemass - Mr Brownlow
 Lysette Anthony - Rose Maylie / Agnes Fleming (Anthony had previously played Oliver's mother in the 1982 adaptation of the novel.)
 Pip Donaghy - Monks
David Garlick - The Artful Dodger (Garlick had previously played the Dodger on Broadway and West End revivals of Oliver!)
 Nicholas Bond-Owen - Charley Bates
David King - Giles
Gillian Martell - Mrs. Maylie
 Edward Burnham - Mr Grimwig
 Julian Firth - Noah Claypole
 Miriam Margolyes - Mrs Corney (later Mrs Bumble)
 Raymond Witch - Mr. Sowerberry
 Terry Molloy - Brittles
 Christian Rodska - Barney
 Dominic Jephcott - Harry Maylie
Carys Llewelyn - Charlotte
Christopher Driscoll - Toby Crackit
 Janet Henfrey - Martha
David McKail - Doctor Losberne
Scott Funnell - Young Oliver Twist

References

External links 

1985 British television series debuts
1985 British television series endings
1980s British drama television series
1980s British television miniseries
Television shows based on Oliver Twist
Costume drama television series
Television series set in the 19th century
English-language television shows
Television series about orphans